Plati is a village in the northern part of the Evros regional unit in Greece. It is part of the municipal unit Trigono. In 2011 its population was 655. Plati is located on the left bank of the river Ardas, between the villages Elaia to the west and Arzos to the east.

Population

History

The village was founded by the Ottoman Turks, it was known as Sadirli then. After a brief period of Bulgarian rule between 1913 and 1919, it became part of Greece. As a result, its Bulgarian and Turkish population was exchanged with Greek refugees, mainly from today's Turkey.

See also

List of settlements in the Evros regional unit

External links
Plati on GTP Travel Pages

References

Populated places in Evros (regional unit)